Forrest may refer to:

Places

Australia
Forrest, Australian Capital Territory
Forrest, Victoria, a small rural township
Division of Forrest, a federal division of the Australian House of Representatives, in Western Australia
Electoral district of Forrest, Western Australia, an electoral district from 1904 to 1950
Forrest Land District, Western Australia, a cadastral division
Forrest, Western Australia, a small settlement and railway station
Forrest Airport
Forrest River, Western Australia
Forrest Highway, Western Australia

United States
Forrest, Illinois, a village
Forrest City, Arkansas
Forrest Township, Livingston County, Illinois
Forrest County, Mississippi
Camp Forrest, an American World War II training base in Tullahoma, Tennessee

Elsewhere
Forrest Pass, Marie Byrd Land, Antarctica
Forrest, Manitoba, Canada, a small town
Forrest Road, a street in Edinburgh, Scotland

People and fictional characters
Forrest (surname)
Forrest (given name)
Forrest (singer), born Forrest Thomas, an American singer popular in the UK and Netherlands

Other uses
Apache Forrest, a web-publishing framework
Tropical Storm Forrest (disambiguation), a storm and two typhoons
Forrest School (disambiguation)
Forrest Elementary School District, Cochise County, Arizona
, a World War II US Navy destroyer
CSS Forrest, a Confederate gunboat in the American Civil War
Forrest Group, a Belgian group of companies
Forrest Baronets, a title in the Baronetage of the United Kingdom
Forrest Theatre, Philadelphia, Pennsylvania
"Forrest", a song by The Smith Street Band from More Scared of You Than You Are of Me, 2017

See also

Forrest classification, a classification of upper gastrointestinal hemorrhage
Forrest Yoga, a modern style of yoga named for and founded by Ana T. Forrest
Forrestal (disambiguation)
Forrester (disambiguation)
Forest (disambiguation)